Saleh Badr Al-Yazidi (born February 10, 1993) is a Qatari football player who plays for Al Ahli as a midfielder. He also plays for Qatar's Olympic and U-20 teams. His family is descended from the sheikhdom ruled by the Yazidi tribe in Lower Yafa, a historic state in what was then known as the British Aden Protectorate (present-day Yemen). He played football for a team in Yemen in his youth years, and was later a student at the acclaimed Aspire Academy in Qatar. He gained Qatari citizenship in July 2011. His family still lives in Yafa.

Club career
Yazidi previously played for Al Muaither's youth teams. He later joined Aspire Academy, before becoming a part of Al Sadd's youth team, where he won the top scorer title for the U-19 league with 14 goals in 2011. He graduated from Aspire Academy in 2010.

He made his first-team debut for Al Sadd in 2010.

International career

U-20 team
Yazidi made his debut for the national youth team on August, 2011, against Japan. He featured in the 2012 AFC U-19 Championship qualification campaign for the Qatar under–20 team. He scored 3 goals in the 5 matches Qatar played, including a brace against Bahrain. Qatar finished at the top of their group, ending the qualification with a loss against Tajikistan.

Yazidi also played one game in the 10th International Friendship Youth Tournament, which Qatar came runners-up in, scoring a goal.

He participated in the ASPIRE U–19 tournament in which Qatar won. He played all 3 games and scored a brace against Tunisia.

U-23 team
Yazidi made his U–23 debut in the 2012 Summer Olympic Qualifiers. His first appearance was on 5 February 2012 against Oman, in a dramatic match which ended 2–2. Shortly after, he featured in a match against Saudi Arabia, which Qatar won 2–1, thanks to an assist Yazidi provided to Hassan Al Haidos two minutes before half-time.

In the qualifying campaign for the 2014 AFC U-22 Asian Cup, he participated in a warm-up game against the UAE. He also came on as a substitute in their first group stage game against Maldives in the 60th minute, scoring a goal 17 minutes later in the 77th minute in order to give Qatar 2–0 win.

Honours
Qatar Youth League Top Scorer
2011

Personal
He is a distant relative of Mohammed Al Yazidi, who is also an Al Sadd player.

References

External links 
 Player profile - QSL.com.qa
 FIFA.com - Men's Olympic Football Tournament : Photos

1993 births
Living people
Qatari footballers
Qatar international footballers
Muaither SC players
Al Sadd SC players
Umm Salal SC players
Al-Khor SC players
Al-Sailiya SC players
Al-Markhiya SC players
Al-Shamal SC players
Al Bidda SC players
Al Ahli SC (Doha) players
Yemeni emigrants to Qatar
Naturalised citizens of Qatar
Qatari people of Yemeni descent
Aspire Academy (Qatar) players
Qatar Stars League players
Qatari Second Division players
Association football midfielders